Heterotrichus is a genus of leaf beetles in the subfamily Eumolpinae. It is distributed in Southeast Asia and Southern China.

Species
 Heterotrichus balyi Chapuis, 1874
 Heterotrichus hirsutus (Tan & Wang, 2005)

Synonyms:
 Heterotrichus violaceus (Jacoby, 1889): synonym of Heterotrichus balyi Chapuis, 1874

References

Eumolpinae
Chrysomelidae genera
Beetles of Asia
Taxa named by Félicien Chapuis